Juan Prim y Prats, 1st Count of Reus, 1st Marquis of los Castillejos, 1st Viscount of Bruch (6 December 1814 – 30 December 1870) was a Spanish general and statesman who was briefly Prime Minister of Spain until his assassination.

Biography

Born in Reus on 6 December 1814, Prim was the son of lieutenant colonel Pablo Prim. He entered the free corps known as the tiradores de Isabel II and met his baptism of fire on 7 August 1834, during the First Carlist War, facing the Carlist party of Triaxet.

Over the course of the war he rose to the rank of lieutenant-colonel and had two orders of knighthood conferred upon him. After the pacification of 1839, as a progressist opposed to the dictatorship of General Espartero, he was sent into exile. However, in 1843 he was elected deputy for Tarragona, and after defeating Espartero at Bruch he entered Madrid in triumph with General Serrano. The regent Maria Christina promoted him major-general, and made him conde de Reus (Count of Reus) and vizconde del Bruch (Viscount of Bruch).

General Narváez, the prime minister, failed to understand what constitutional freedom meant, and General Prim, on showing signs of opposition, was sentenced to six years' imprisonment in the Philippine Islands. The sentence was not carried out, and Prim remained an exile in England and France until the amnesty of 1847. He then returned to Spain, and was first employed as captain-general of Puerto Rico (Governor of Puerto Rico) and afterwards as military representative with the sultan during the Crimean War. In 1854 he was elected to the cortes, and gave his support to General O'Donnell, who promoted him lieutenant-general in 1856. In the war with Morocco he did such good service at Castillejos (Fnideq), Cabo Negro, Guad al Gelu and Campamento in 1860 that he was made marqués de los Castillejos (Marquess of los Castillejos) and Grande de España (Grandee of Spain).

Prim commanded the Spanish expeditionary army in Mexico in 1862, when Spain, Great Britain, and France sought forced payment from the liberal government of Benito Juárez for loans. Prim was a sympathizer with the Mexican liberal cause, thus he refused to consent to the ambitious schemes of French emperor Napoleon III, and withdrew Spanish forces following a meeting with Manuel Doblado. Prim was a staunch supporter of the Union in the American Civil War and on his trip to the United States, where he visited New York and Philadelphia, he met with Lincoln in Washington.

On Prim's return to Spain he joined the opposition, heading pronunciamentos in Catalonia against generals Narváez and O'Donnell. All his attempts failed until the death of Narváez in April 1868, after which Queen Isabella became increasingly tyrannical, until at last even Serrano was exiled. In September 1868 General Serrano and General Prim returned, and Brigadier Topete, commanding the fleet, raised the standard of revolt at Cádiz. In July 1869 General Serrano was elected regent, and Prim became president of the council and was made a marshal.

On 6 November 1870 Amadeo, Duke of Aosta, was elected king of Spain, but General Prim, on leaving the chamber of the Cortes on 28 December, was shot by unknown assassins and died two days later. The Cortes took his children as wards of the country; three days afterwards King Amadeo I swore in the presence of the corpse to observe the new Spanish constitution. This is due to the fact that Prim had searched all the European courts of the time trying to find a monarch who was not opposed to being democratically elected. He is quoted for saying that "looking for a democratic monarch in Europe is like trying to find an atheist in heaven". After France had rejected the almost elected Leopold of Hohenzollern because of their fear that Prussia might thereby become more powerful, Amadeo of Savoy was the most fitting who consented.

The workshop of metalworker Plácido Zuloaga was commissioned to make a monumental sarcophagus for Prim. Completed in 1875 in Eibar, this now resides in the cemetery at Reus.

Gallery

See also
 List of unsolved murders

References
Informational notes

Citations

Bibliography
 

Further reading

 (in French, contains a useful bibliography).
 Schurz was the United States' ambassador to Spain in 1860. In his Reminiscences, he gives a short biography of Prim as well as his recollections of his own talks with Prim and the Spanish court.

External links
Map (1866) of the approximate route of Prim from Ocaña to Portugal.

1814 births
1870 deaths
Military personnel from Catalonia
Politicians from Catalonia
Counts of Spain
Deaths by firearm in Spain
Governors of Puerto Rico
Grandees of Spain
Laureate Cross of Saint Ferdinand
Male murder victims
Marquesses of Spain
People from Reus
People murdered in Spain
Prime Ministers of Spain
Spanish captain generals
Spanish Freemasons
Second French intervention in Mexico
Viscounts of Spain
Exiled Spanish politicians
Unsolved murders in Spain
Assassinated heads of government
Assassinated Spanish politicians
Military personnel of the First Carlist War
Spanish military personnel of the Hispano-Moroccan War (1859–60)
1870 murders in Spain